1998–99 Ukrainian Football Amateur League was the seventh amateur championship of Ukraine and the 35th since the establishment of championship among fitness clubs (KFK) in 1964.

Teams

Location map

First stage

Group 1

Group 2

Group 3

Group 4

Finals
The second stage was finals that took place in Lutsk, Volyn Oblast on June 2–6, 1999.

Group A

Group B

External links
 Information on the competition
 Ukrainskyi futbol. 5 June 1999 (PDF, in Ukrainian)

Ukrainian Football Amateur League seasons
4
Ukra